Action is a 2019 Indian Tamil-language action film written and directed by Sundar C. and produced by R. Ravindran under his banner Trident Arts. The film stars Vishal and Tamannaah as army officers Subhash and Diya, who embark on a globetrotting mission to hunt down a terrorist. The film co-stars Akanksha Puri, Aishwarya Lekshmi, marking the debut in Tamil cinema, Ramki, Chaya Singh, Yogi Babu, and Kabir Duhan Singh. The music was composed by Hiphop Tamizha. It also marks Vishal's second collaborations with Sundar C. after Aambala and with Tamannaah after Kaththi Sandai. Sundar C makes a cameo appearance.

Action was released theatrically on 15 November 2019 and received praise for action sequences, cast performances(particularly Vishal) and soundtrack, but criticism directed towards the writing. It was an average venture at the box office, but was a success in its Hindi-dubbed version, which was released in 2020.

Plot
Subhash is a Colonel in the Indian Army, whose father is the retired CM of Tamil Nadu, and is now succeeded by his elder son Saravanan. Subhash calls his whole family along with his lover, Meera for a short trip. During a campaign involving the Prime Ministerial candidate Guptaji, Saravanan finds out that his friend Deepak has fled after extracting  on loan. 

Saravanan calls Deepak, who tells him to leave the ceremony. On the other hand, Subhash tries to converse with Meera during the campaign and sends her a message. Realizing that she left her phone in the car, Meera goes to the parking lot, where her phone gets exchanged with that of a killer. After noting the killer duo's vehicle number, Meera tries to escape but gets attacked and brutally stomped to death by a woman disguised as a cop. Retrieving the phone, she gives a call to the cell bomb placed in a cooler at the stage. The bomb goes off, knocking down Saravanan and his family while killing Guptaji. Subhash gets shattered to find Meera's corpse, while Saravanan gets framed for the assassination with the help of Deepak. 

Having recorded a conversation with Deepak, Saravanan calls for a press conference at his house amidst violent protests, but is found hanging in his room thus making the media believe that he was involved. Subhash finds out about the killer woman through the vehicle number Meera noted on her palm. Looking at the tattoo on her neck in the CCTV footage at the vehicle store and her phone's screen, Subhash manages to track her, through further investigations finds that she is Kiara, who is a contract killer in London. With the help of a hacker named Jack, Subhash manages to trace Kaira and fights off her henchmen and kill her by hanging her in the same way she killed and hanged Saravanan to death. Subhash then arrives in Istanbul and is joined by his brother-in-law and friend Lieutenant Diya. 

Targeting Deepak's account, they plan to extract the money. The mission goes as planned, and Subhash succeeds in retrieving the money from Deepak's account. However, the trio traces Deepak's location and finds him in Algornia where they find him dead and a chase ensues, resulting in a heroic escape. Subhash realises a cop, posing as a blind man has killed Deepak and framed him. They find that the cop is none other than the police commissioner of Istanbul. Using Diya as a bait, Subhash lures the cop and his henchmen into a trap and fights them off, where he threatens to kill the cop, who then reveals that Syed Ibrahim Malik, a Pakistan-based wanted terrorist is the real conspirator behind the explosion. 

With the help of his Lt. Gen. Rehman, Subhash decides to bring Malik to India on his own where Diya accompanies him, They reach Lahore illegally where a covert operative named Imran introduces him to Malik's location and armed forces. Learning of Malik's daughter's wedding, Diya enters the house with a fake ID card during the celebrations and secretly drops flammable balls which led to a fire accident during the sunrise. Malik is ordered by the Pakistan Army General Tahir Iqbal to accompany his officers to a safe house. Using the opportunity, Subhash chases after the vehicle and successfully takes Malik hostage. Following a car chase, he manages to escape while Diya and Imran wait for him at the airport, but Malik is left in the car. 

Tahir admits him to a hospital where he realises it's his body double who was ordered by Malik himself to accompany Tahir's army, due to being held on gunpoint by Subhash. The two engage in hand-to-hand combat, following which Subash captured him. Disguised, Subhash and his gang board the plane before Tahir intervenes and orders to stop it after the airport authorities identify Subhash. The flight to India is stopped and Tahir rushes inside, only to realise Subhash and his team took off in a flight to Nepal. Landing in Nepal, Subhash hands over Malik to the Indian Army. During the posthumous honouring of Saravanan, more conspirators including Saravanan's senior and ex-PM candidate Varma are arrested, where it is revealed that Subhash killed Malik during a staged escape.

Cast

Soundtrack 

The soundtrack album is composed by Hiphop Tamizha, collaborating with Vishal and Sundar. C for their previous outing Aambala. The lyrics were written by Pa. Vijay, Hiphop Tamizha, Arivu, Paul B Sailus, and  Navz47.

The album features five tracks, and all of them were released as singles, before being released as an album on 30 October 2019.

The original version of the song, was performed by Hiphop Adhi and Paul B Sailus.

Release
The official teaser was released on 13 September 2019, followed by the trailer which was released on 27 October 2019. The film was theatrically released in India on 15 November 2019.

Critical reception 
Action received mixed reviews from critics. 

Firstpost gave 2 out of 5 stars stating "Vishal, Tamannaah starrer is a formulaic entertainer with no proper storyline. If only the film had a script with some logic and was a bit racier, it could have been a time pass entertainer".
The Times of India gave 2.5 out of 5 stars stating, "A handful of action set pieces, set in exotic locales, strung together by a semblance of a plot. If you dig the corniness of the lines and the OTT-ness of the stunts, then you might be able to enjoy the film".
Sify gave 2 out of 5 stars stating "Action is a below-average action thriller from Sundar C- Vishal combo". Baradwaj Rangan of Film Companion South wrote "Like any self-respecting popcorn entertainer, there are OTT moments aplenty. Killer mehndi cones? Bring ’em on. But there’s always a little surprise around the corner".

Box office
Action failed commercially; Made on a budget of INR 44 crore, it collected INR 7.7 crore in Tamil Nadu box office and INR 4 crore in Andhra Pradesh and Telangana. Having assured the producers he would bear the losses if the film did not collect a minimum of INR 20 crore and compensate by doing a film for them, the production company Trident Arts filed a petition against Vishal for making the film under his own banner. Following the petition, Vishal was ordered by the Madras High Court to compensate for the losses incurred.

Home media
The Satellite Rights of the film were sold to Vijay TV and began streaming on Amazon Prime Video from 16 December 2019. The film was released on DVD in Taiwan on 23 October 2020 and in Japan on 4 November 2020. The film was later dubbed in Hindi and directly premiered on Sony Max and released on YouTube by Goldmines Telefilms on 4 October 2020.

References

External links

2010s Tamil-language films
Films scored by Hiphop Tamizha
Films shot in Chennai
Films shot in Baku
Indian action adventure films
Indian action thriller films
Films directed by Sundar C.
Films shot in Istanbul
Films about terrorism in India
Films set in London
Films set in the Caribbean
Films set in Istanbul
Fictional portrayals of the Tamil Nadu Police
Indian Army in films
Films set in Uttarakhand
Films about military personnel
Indian films about revenge
Indian nonlinear narrative films
Films set in Lahore